Rivière-de-la-Savane is an unorganized territory in the Mauricie, province of Quebec, Canada, part of the Mékinac Regional County Municipality. This territory includes among others the Irénée-Marie Ecological Reserve and Zec du Chapeau-de-Paille.

Geography 
Located west of the Saint-Maurice River, the shape of this area resembles to the number "1" bent on 45 degrees to the northwest and its southern boundary is formed by the Matawin River. This area is located north of La Mauricie National Park.

Its entire area is forested.

References

External links

Unorganized territories in Mauricie